New Richmond Regional Airport  is a large general aviation airport located in the city of New Richmond, Wisconsin, United States.  The airport is owned by the City of New Richmond and operated by a seven member airport commission. It is included in the Federal Aviation Administration (FAA) National Plan of Integrated Airport Systems for 2021–2025, in which it is categorized as a local general aviation facility.  As of October 1, 2022, the FAA upgraded the classification of the airport and it is now considered a regional airport facility.  The State of Wisconsin classifies the airport as a corporate/transport airport.

Almost 225 aircraft are based in privately owned hangars. The airport is home to thirteen aviation related businesses and several business aircraft. The airport contributes millions of dollars per year to the New Richmond area and East Metro economy. The airport serves the Eastern Twin Cities Metro Area and Western Wisconsin, including the popular attractions Cedar Lake Speedway and Somerset recreation areas.

The airport serves a population base estimated at 175,000 people, including the following municipalities:  New Richmond, Hudson, River Falls, Baldwin, Hammond, Woodville, Glenwood City, Amery, Clear Lake, Somerset, and Stillwater, MN.

New Richmond Regional Airport is the only public use airport in St. Croix County.

History

The airport was commissioned by the FAA in July 1964 with a  primary runway (Runway 13-31) and a  turf runway (Runway 4-22).

In 1992, a major construction project was completed.  The primary runway was demolished and replaced by a new  runway (Runway 14-32).  The original hangar area located on the south end of the airport was also updated to allow additional hangars.  A new aircraft parking apron was also constructed.

In 1998, an additional taxi lane was added to the south hangar area.  The hangar area was completely filled by the end of 1998 with 45 hangars.

In 2000, a new hangar area was constructed on the north end of the airport.  The new area accommodated a mix of 32 small and medium-sized hangars.  A full-length parallel taxiway to runway 14-32 was also completed along with a small apron.

In 2001, a second addition to the north aircraft parking apron was completed.

In 2004, a corporate/business aviation hangar area was added to the north hangar area allowing the construction of up to seven large hangars. A third addition to the aircraft parking apron in the north hangar area was completed. An additional taxiway was also added to the north hangar area to accommodate additional private hangars. A grant from the Department of Homeland Security allowed the construction of a security fence and three automated security gates around the airport.

In 2005, two new taxiways were added to the north hangar area to allow an additional 14 private and corporate hangars.

In 2006, construction began on an extension to the  primary runway and parallel taxiway to runway 14-32. The runway was completed in June 2007 and the parallel taxiway was completed in August 2007. A helicopter landing apron and a connecting taxiway in the corporate hangar area were also completed as part of the 2006-2007 project.

In 2008, the airport completed the purchase of over  adjoining the north side of the airport. The land will be used for future economic development. Reconstruction of the oldest portion of the primary runway started on September 8, along with the replacement and upgrading of the runway lighting system. Blast/overrun pads were installed on each end of the primary runway. A connecting taxiway in the corporate hangar area was also constructed. The runway was reopened for operations on October 4.

In 2010, a taxiway, taxi lane and access road serving the northeast side of the airport was completed. The project provided the necessary infrastructure for future aviation related businesses. Additional security fencing and gates were also part of the 2010 project.

In 2023, the south hangar area pavement originally installed in the fall of 1992, will undergo reconstruction.  The existing asphalt will be removed along with 6 inch base course and will be replaced with a new 8 inch base course and 3 or 4 inches of asphalt, depending on location.  

The airport will begin developing an airport master plan in 2023.  Engineering firm SEH was selected by the Wisconsin Bureau of Aeronautics in February of 2023 for this task.

Airport businesses

East Metro Jet Center (full and self service fuel including 100LL, Jet A1, and MoGas, deicing, GPU, lav service, potable water service, Corporate Aircraft Association (CAA) member), Elevated Aircraft (aircraft sales), Indianhead Airways (piston and turbine aircraft maintenance), Perceptive Avionics (avionics sales and service), New Richmond Aero (piston aircraft maintenance), Proto Type Machine / Aerospace Hydraulics (precision made aircraft parts), Mike Demulling Flight Instruction (primary and advanced flight training), NDT Solutions (non-destructive testing and equipment manufacturing), New Richmond Airside Rental (rental vehicles for passengers and crew), Orion Airmotive (aircraft charter), Super Clean Aircraft (Tyler Vizenor - piston and turbine aircraft detailing) and Top Flight Avionics.

Airport operations

The airport is funded from lease fees for hangar lots and taxes on the hangars. No additional non airport produced funds are used to operate the airport. 

New Richmond Regional Airport covers an area of 424 acres (172 ha) at an elevation of 997 feet (304 m) above mean sea level.

In January 2023, there were 220 aircraft based at this airport: 175 single-engine, 20 multi-engine, 9 jet, 4 helicopter, 1 glider, 6 military and 5 ultra-light.

The airport created an on-site fire department with the addition of an E-One Titan aircraft rescue and firefighting (ARFF) vehicle in February of 2022.  The vehicle entered service in the spring of 2022 and is staffed by airport personnel and New Richmond Fire and Rescue.

Airport personnel provide 24 hour coverage for snow and ice removal on all airport surfaces. As of March of 2022, the snow removal fleet consisted of 3 single axle dump trucks with 12 foot plows and 9 foot wings, 1 single axle dump truck with 12 foot plow, 1 reserve dump truck with 12 foot plow, Two 14 foot MB Companies runway sweepers, a 16 foot pusher plow, a Cat 950 loader, a New Holland TV-145 bi-directional industrial tool carrier tractor, a 900 ton per hour Fair Manufacturing snow blower, and a 5,000 ton per hour Wausau snow blower mounted on an Oshkosh chassis.  The airport also utilizes a 15' truck mounted boom sprayer for application of E-36 runway deicing fluid.  A New Holland T-8 industrial tractor with 20 foot ramp plow, 14' MB Companies runway sweeper, and 1100 ton per hour Fair Manufacturing snow blower were added to the fleet in February of 2023.

The airport is considered the largest in Wisconsin based on the number of hangars on site, which total 117 existing or under-construction hangars as of February of 2023.

Weather

The airport has an on-site Automated Weather Observation Station (AWOS) providing continuous aviation weather METAR reports. In the event of an AWOS outage, manual weather observations are recorded by trained weather observers. In August 2006, the National Weather Service in Chanhassen, MN began issuing Terminal Aerodrome Forecasts (TAF) for New Richmond Regional Airport.

Instrument approaches

The airport has two precision LPV GPS / RNAV approaches. The non-directional beacon (NDB) became obsolete with the implementation of the RNAV approaches and was turned off on January 3, 2012 and is now decommissioned.  The antenna was removed and the orange and white radio transmitter building was dismantled in the summer of 2013.

Air shows

Air shows were held each June from 2004 through 2007. No air show was held in 2008 due to various ongoing airport construction projects. In 2009, the air show was converted into a fly-in event.

See also
List of airports in Wisconsin

References

External links
 New Richmond Airport frequency on LiveATC.Net
 Airport website
 Airnav - airport information
 City of New Richmond
 Aerial photos of the airport and New Richmond area

Airports in Wisconsin
Buildings and structures in St. Croix County, Wisconsin